= Andrea Tuana =

Uruguayan feminist social worker, researcher and teacher

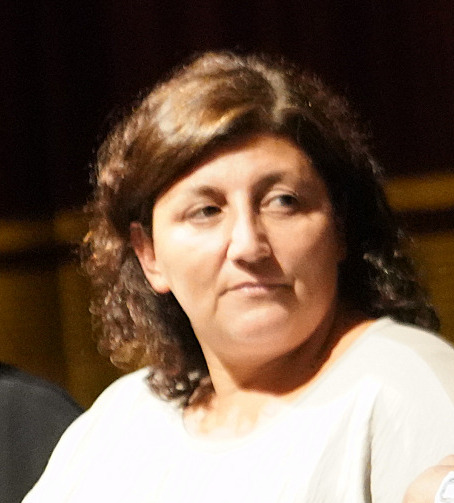
- Andrea Tuana in 2023
- Born: 4 July 1969 (age 57); Montevideo, Uruguay
- Occupations: Social worker; activist

Andrea Tuana Nägeli (born 4 July 1969 in Montevideo) is a Uruguayan social worker, activist and feminist.

With a degree in social work and a specialization in gender, development, and planning, as well as a master’s degree in public policy and gender, Tuana is a renowned activist against gender-based, domestic, and sexual violence against children, adolescents, and women, and against human trafficking.

== Selected works ==
- Explotación sexual de niñas, niños y adolescentes : manual sobre conceptos básicos y herramientas de intervención (2019), en coautoría con Fabiana Condon y Milka da Cunha.
- Trata sexual en Uruguay : alcances y limitaciones de la asistencia a víctimas (2018).
- Derechos humanos y violencia doméstica : herramientas conceptuales para docentes (2013), compilación y coordinación.
- Campaña Nunca más a mi lado : campaña de denuncia y prevención de la violencia doméstica (s.d.).
- La trata de mujeres con fines de explotación sexual en el Mercosur : diagnóstico regional (2012), en coautoría con Diana González Perett, Laura Sardá, Liliana Ruso, Verónica Teresi, Lourdes Barboza y Cristina Prego.
- El género, la edad y los escenarios de la violencia sexual (2009), en coautoría con Diana González Perett.
- Invisibles y silenciadas : aportes y reflexiones sobre la trata de personas con fines de explotación sexual comercial en Uruguay (2006), en coautoría con Diana González Perett.
- Violencia doméstica e incidencia en políticas públicas (2005).
